The 1967 NCAA University Division basketball tournament involved 23 schools playing in single-elimination play to determine the national champion of men's NCAA Division I college basketball. It began on Saturday, March 11, and ended two weeks later with the championship game on March 25 in Louisville, Kentucky. A total of 27 games were played, including a third-place game in each region and a national third-place game.

UCLA, coached by John Wooden, won the national title with a 79–64 victory in the final game over Dayton, coached by Don Donoher. Sophomore center Lew Alcindor (later named Kareem Abdul-Jabbar) of UCLA was named the tournament's Most Outstanding Player. This was the first of seven consecutive NCAA titles for UCLA and the first of three consecutive Most Outstanding Player awards for Alcindor.

Locations

For the fifth time, Louisville and Freedom Hall would host the Final Four. Once again all the venues used were either on college campuses or, in the case of Freedom Hall, the off-campus main venue for a college team. The tournament saw two new venues used for the first time. The tournament came to New England, the state of Rhode Island and the University of Rhode Island for the first time, with games played at Keaney Gym. This was one of two different venues used for East first round games, along with Cassell Coliseum. Meanwhile, for the third straight year the Midwest & West first round games were played at a single site. For the first time, the tournament came to Colorado, with games played at Colorado State Auditorium-Gymnasium (commonly referred to as Moby Gym for its whaleback-style roof). This would be the only time the tournament would be played at Colorado State University and is, to date, the only college campus in the state of Colorado to host tournament games (all other games have been played in downtown Denver). This would also be the last time the tournament would be held in Blacksburg, with Williamsburg hosting the tournament next within the state of Virginia, a few years later.

Teams

Bracket
* – Denotes overtime period

East region

Mideast region

Midwest region

West region

Final Four

Regional third place games

See also
 1967 NCAA College Division basketball tournament
 1967 National Invitation Tournament
 1967 NAIA Division I men's basketball tournament

References

NCAA Division I men's basketball tournament
Ncaa
Basketball competitions in Louisville, Kentucky
NCAA Division I men's basketball tournament
NCAA Division I men's basketball tournament
College sports tournaments in Kentucky